KVSR (90.7 FM) is a Christian radio station licensed to Kirksville, Missouri, United States.  The station is an affiliate of Spirit FM, broadcasting a Christian Contemporary Music format with a few Christian talk and teaching programs, and is currently owned by Lake Area Educational Broadcasting Foundation.

History
The station was previously owned by Care Broadcasting, and held the callsign KHGN from the time it came on the air in 1998 until July 2010. The station was initially known as "The Heartland's Good News Station", and primarily aired Christian talk and teaching programming as an affiliate of Moody Broadcasting Network. KHGN became an affiliate of Spirit FM in March 2007, and was sold to Lake Area Educational Broadcasting Foundation on April 22, 2010. On July 27, 2010, the station's callsign was changed to KVSR.

References

External links
KVSR's website
 

VSR